Cama is a surname. Notable people with this surname include:
Alba Rojo Cama (1961–2016), Mexican sculptor
 (born 1987), Italian footballer
Bhikaiji Cama (1861–1936), Indian independence activist
 (born 1976), Spanish politician
Cyrus Cama (born 1971), Indian Olympic sailor
Fereimi Cama (1955–2021), Fijian Anglican bishop
James Cama (1957–2014), American martial artist
Jioji Cama, Fijian rugby footballer
Junior Tomasi Cama (born 1980), New Zealand rugby footballer, son of Tomasi
Kharshedji Rustomji Cama (1831–1909), Indian Parsi scholar and reformer
 (born 1935), Spanish motorcyclist
 (1864–1914), Spanish cork manufacturer
Tomasi Cama (born 1961), Fijian rugby footballer, father of Junior